Madhusudan Ramachandra Rege  (18 March 1924 – 16 December 2013) was an Indian cricketer who played in one Test match in 1949 against West Indies.

He played for Maharashtra from 1944–45 to 1954–55, captaining the team from 1951–52 to 1954–55. His highest score was 164, against Gujarat in the Ranji Trophy in 1953–54.

For Maharashtra against the MCC in 1951–52, he opened the batting and scored 133 out of the team's total of 249, then became the first Indian player to be called for throwing.

References

External links
 

1924 births
2013 deaths
India Test cricketers
Indian cricketers
Maharashtra cricketers
Hindus cricketers
South Zone cricketers
West Zone cricketers
People from Navi Mumbai
Cricketers from Maharashtra